Urban Legends: Final Cut (also known as Urban Legends 2: Final Cut or simply Urban Legend 2) is a 2000 slasher film directed by John Ottman in his directorial debut, and starring Jennifer Morrison, Matthew Davis, Hart Bochner, Joseph Lawrence, Anthony Anderson, and Loretta Devine. In addition to directing, Ottman also edited the film and composed its score. A sequel to Urban Legend (1998), it is the second installment in the Urban Legend film series. It follows a film student being stalked by a serial killer in a fencing mask, who begins murdering the crew members of her thesis film about urban legends.

Filmed in late 1999, Urban Legends: Final Cut was released in the United States on September 22, 2000 by Columbia Pictures. Although it made only roughly half of its predecessor's gross, it was still successful, grossing $38.6 million on a budget of $14 million. The film was universally panned by critics upon release, and was followed by the direct-to-video sequel Urban Legends: Bloody Mary in 2005.

Plot 
Amy Mayfield, a student at prestigious film school Alpine University, is unsure about what her thesis film is going to be. But after a conversation with security guard Reese Wilson about her experience with a series of murders that had happened on the campus she had previously worked in, she is inspired to make a film about a serial killer murdering in the fashion of urban legends. Meanwhile, fellow student Lisa has a drink with classmate Travis at a bar before her scheduled flight out of town. While leaving the bar, she begins to feel dazed, and is attacked and abducted in the coat room. She wakes up in a bathtub filled with ice and discovers that her kidney has been removed. Attacked by her abductor, she tries to flee through the window, but is decapitated in the process.

The next day, Amy is preparing the shooting of her thesis film but is deserted by the assigned camera man, Toby, who accuses Amy of stealing his thesis idea. Shooting begins with another camera man, Simon. When Sandra, Amy's actress friend who played a victim in a scene, returns to an empty studio after forgetting her keys, she is attacked and slashed to death with a straight razor. Her peers witness her filmed death when the material is smuggled into a sequence of takes of the scene. Amy is disturbed by the footage, and is unable to figure out who shot it; her peers, however, discount it as a piece of a showreel. Sandra's absence is unnoticed, as she was supposed to leave for an audition in Los Angeles for a bit part on ER the following day.

Travis commits suicide in the campus tower, apparently spurred by a poor grade received on his thesis film which disqualified him from receiving the university's Hitchcock Award. At his funeral, the arrogant Graham, the son of a Hollywood director, offers to help Amy with her film; she declines, after which he discloses to her that he is aware of her backgroundher father was a famous documentarian, a fact she has kept hidden from most of their peers. After the funeral, Amy meets Travis' twin brother, Trevor, who explains to her that he believes his brother was murdered. Later, while Amy is recording audio loops of screams for the film, Simon is beaten to death outside, and the audio of his death is inadvertently recorded. While going over the loops, Amy is attacked by the killer, donning a fencing mask. She is chased through the campus, but manages to evade him.

Before filming another scene for Amy's film in an empty carnival ride, sophomores Stan and Dirk are attacked and electrocuted while preparing the set. Amy discovers the corpses and is again confronted by the killer. She escapes again and informs the police, who attribute the deaths to accidental electrocution. Amy is comforted by Trevor. They begin having sex when Trevor suddenly stabs Amy. She wakes up and realizes that it was only a dream. Amy later notices a light inside the bell tower. She goes there and finds her friend, Vanessa waiting for her. Vanessa, a lesbian, presents a note she received addressed to her from Amy, in which it states that she has romantic feelings for Vanessa. Amy explains that she did not write the note, and fears that both women have been lured there. They are startled by the killer; Amy presses a panic button in the tower, but the killer manages to pursue them to the top of the tower. Once at the top, Amy is locked in a closet by the killer, where she finds the corpses of Simon and Sandra. Upon breaking free, she finds Vanessa hanging from the bell. Amy runs out of the tower passing Reese, who was notified of the disturbance via the campus security system.

Amy runs into the arms of Trevor. Later, he tells her he has found that all the murder victims worked on Travis' thesis film. After watching some of Travis' film, The Gods of Men, they suspect Toby, the only person who worked on the film who is still alive. They kidnap Toby and call in Professor Solomon to an empty film set to present their suspicions. However, Toby reveals that Travis faked Toby's sound credit to help him graduate, admitting that he never went anywhere near Travis' film. Graham happens upon the confrontation, watching from a window. In the confusion, Solomon reveals himself as the killer, attempting to frame Amy and usurp the Hitchcock Awardwhich includes a large stipendby presenting Travis' film as his own. A melee ensues in which Amy wrestles his gun from him and holds him at gunpoint. Reese stumbles upon the scene, and a standoff occurs. Solomon leaps at Amy, and she discharges the gun in his abdomen.

At the Hitchcock Awards ceremony, Trevor attends to accept the award on his brother's behalf. As he goes onstage, production assistant Kevin appears as a sniper in the rafters, only to be shot by Reese. The altercation is revealed to be a scene in Amy's new film, Urban Legends, on which Toby and Graham are working on her behalf.

Later, Solomon, now using a wheelchair, is in a mental institution where, after watching Amy's film, a nurse asks him if he enjoyed the movie. He is wheeled out by the nurseBrenda Bates, from the original filmwho tells him that they have a lot in common.

Cast

Production

Development and writing 
The screenplay for Urban Legends: Final Cut was written by Paul Harris Boardman and Scott Derrickson. Ottman sought a "wacky" tone for the film that was more tongue-in-cheek than that of its predecessor.

Pre-production 
Anson Mount originally auditioned for the dual role of Travis / Trevor Stark, but had wanted to play the role of the antagonistic Toby instead; according to Ottman, he "aced" his audition for Toby, and was cast in the role. Matthew Davis auditioned for the role of Travis / Trevor, and was cast, marking his first major film role. Eva Mendes was cast in the role of Vanessa, which had originally been a smaller role, but was expanded to allow her character to be a potential red herring.

Filming 

Principal photography took place in Toronto, Ontario, Canada over a period of 47 days in the fall of 1999.  The film's opening sequence on the airplane, which was shot over a period of three days, was originally written to have occurred on a boat; however, the script was altered last-minute after the production crew came across an airplane set from the film Pushing Tin (1999). Due to the film's low budget, director Ottman chose to make use of the set, and staged the sequence on a plane instead.

The university exteriors featured in the film is Trent University in Peterborough, Ontario, which Ottman chose due to its "modern" and institutional architecture as opposed to Gothic. The bell tower, however, was constructed solely for the film, for $150,000. Interior sequences, however, were filmed in Toronto. The amusement park Ontario Place served as the filming location for the mining amusement ride sequence; the mine ride featured in the film was in fact a log ride that had been drained of its water for the impending winter months, which was re-dressed to appear as a mine-themed ride. Ottman stated that many of the lighting techniques featured in the filmparticularly the use of strobe lightingwere inspired by Ridley Scott's Alien (1979) and James Cameron's Aliens (1986).

Post-production 
The sequence featuring Lisa and Trevor at the bar (followed by her death scene) was written and shot in Los Angeles after principal photography had finished, as the film's producers felt the film needed a death sequence earlier on to establish a sense of danger. Originally, the production crew intended to make a fake kidney for the sequence (as the character awakens to find her kidney has been removed), but due to budget and time restraints, opted to use a goat's kidney from a butcher shop. Because a goat kidney is anatomically larger than that of a human, it had to be truncated to reduce its size.

Director Ottman also edited the film, and remarked in the audio commentary on the film's 2001 DVD release that many character interaction sequences were truncated or excised entirely to maintain a quicker pace.

Intertextuality

Cinematic allusions 
With the plot centered on a group of film school students, Urban Legends: Final Cut uses a self-reflexive narrative approach and features numerous references and allusions to cinema and other horror films. The opening sequence on the airplane was inspired by the Twilight Zone episode "Nightmare at 20,000 Feet" (1963). Lisa's abduction sequence in which she is incapacitated with a plastic garment bag in a coat closet is an homage to Black Christmas (1974).

Film scholar Jim Harper, in his book Legacy of Blood: A Comprehensive Guide to Slasher Movies (2004), cites Urban Legends: Final Cut as a "post Scream slasher" influenced by Italian giallo films, featuring a "distinct Argento influence" present in the film, particularly in its killer's attire. Harper also notes direct references in the film to the work of Alfred Hitchcock as well as Michael Powell's Peeping Tom (1960), which is paid homage in Sandra's filmed murder scene.

Urban legends 
The following urban legends are mentioned or depicted in the film:
 Lisa is drugged at a bar and wakes up in a bath tub of ice, her kidney being removed.
 Amy recounts a legend about students screaming at midnight to relieve tension, causing a brutal assault to go unnoticed. This is later re-enacted in Simon's death.
 Sandra tells of a burrito contaminated with roach eggs, which then hatch inside a girl's nose and of a chicken sandwich containing pus from the chicken's tumor.
 Vanessa warns Travis that cell phones cause cancer.
 The first scene of Amy's film has a girl discovering the corpse of her dog, who supposedly licked her hand at night, in the shower, with the message "Humans can lick too."
 The basis for one of the scenes in Amy's film is a carnival displaying fake corpses in a "Tunnel of Terror". As the carnival moves on, several children are missing and the fake corpses are revealed to be real.
 Sandra's murder is filmed on camera. Her friends think it is a fake murder because there is no body, but it is actually real and filmed in the same fashion as a "snuff film".

Release

Home media 
Urban Legends: Final Cut was released on DVD by Columbia Pictures Home Entertainment on February 16, 2001. In July 2018, it was announced that Scream Factory would release the film on Blu-ray. It was released on November 20, 2018.

Reception

Box office 
The film brought in $21.4 million in the United States and brought in $17.1 million overseas, bringing its total box office revenue to $38.5 million. The film was considered a moderate success, due to the budget of the film being $14 million. However, the film only grossed about half of what the first film brought in ($72.5 million). Although it did manage to top the box office in its opening weekend, something its predecessor failed to do.

Critical response 
Dave Kehr of The New York Times wrote of the film: "[Director] Ottman doesn't have the firm grasp of tone necessary to make his deliberate ambiguities seem other than simple confusion, nor the sense of humor necessary to turn the deliberate cliches into effective satire. " Robert Koehler of Variety criticized the film's screenplay for being "[too] stuffed with movie references and jokes," and that it "slavishly follows in lock-step with the prior film's Ten Little Indians-like plot line." Writing for the Los Angeles Times, David Chute wrote: "The coolest single element in the walk-don't-run horror sequel Urban Legends: Final Cut may be its atmospheric setting...[the] concept seems tailor-made for that kind of ingenuity, for a little bit of sly wit and playfulness. Movies like Final Cut are bunker-mentality productions, safe, square and purely functional, like buildings made from poured concrete."

Roger Ebert awarded it two stars out of four, declaring that the movie "makes the fatal mistake... of believing there is still life in the wheezy serial-killer-on-campus formula," although he did concede that the production credits were "slick" and the performances "quite adequate given the (narrow) opportunities of the genre." The BBC echoed this in a review by Michael Thomson, who thought that the meta in-jokes of the murder scenes did not work and that the film "keeps the mediocrity [of the first film] alive as it unleashes yet more unsavoury nonsense." The A.V. Clubs Nathan Rabin echoed similar sentiments, writing: "A sequel with the misguided chutzpah to rip off its derivative predecessor, Final Cut proves once again that the self-referential slasher film is every bit as tiresome and devoid of new ideas as the unironic bloodbaths that inspired it in the first place."

The meta-critic site Rotten Tomatoes lists the film as having an approval rating of 9% among critics based on 85 reviews, with an average rating of 3.30/10. The site's consensus is: "This teen horror movie brings nothing new to an already exhausted genre.  And it's bad.  Really bad". Audiences polled by CinemaScore gave the film an average grade of "D+" on an A+ to F scale.

Sequel 

A sequel titled Urban Legends: Bloody Mary, was released in 2005.

Notes

References

Works cited 
 
 Ottman, John. Urban Legends: Final Cut (2001). Audio commentary (DVD). Columbia Pictures Home Entertainment.

External links 
 
 
 

2000 films
2000 horror films
2000s teen horror films
2000s slasher films
2000 LGBT-related films
2000s serial killer films
Lesbian-related films
American mystery horror films
American sequel films
Urban 2
Urban 2
American horror thriller films
English-language Canadian films
Canadian slasher films
Canadian horror films
Columbia Pictures films
Films about filmmaking
Films about organ trafficking
Films based on urban legends
Films scored by John Ottman
Films directed by John Ottman
Films set in universities and colleges
Films shot in Los Angeles
Films shot in Toronto
Mass murder in fiction
Original Film films
Phoenix Pictures films
Self-reflexive films
Films about snuff films
2000 directorial debut films
2000s English-language films
2000s American films
2000s Canadian films
Urban Legend (film series)